Graham Allen born 8 April 1977 in Bolton is a former professional footballer who played as a central defender for Bradford Park Avenue.

Graham started his career at Everton making his debut against Middlesbrough on 26 December 1996. He played 6 times for Everton before signing for Tranmere Rovers in 1998 after a successful loan spell.

He played 200 league games for Tranmere Rovers scoring 10 goals before signing for Rushden & Diamonds in 2004 playing 31 league games and scoring 2 goals before signing for Chester City in 2006. Injuries forced him to retire from professional football after only one year at the Deva Stadium, having made just three league appearances for the Blues.

After spending time on trial with Droylsden, Allen joined Bradford Park Avenue in August 2007, but was released in September 2007.

References

External links

1977 births
Living people
Everton F.C. players
Tranmere Rovers F.C. players
Rushden & Diamonds F.C. players
Chester City F.C. players
Bradford (Park Avenue) A.F.C. players
Premier League players
English Football League players
Footballers from Bolton
English footballers
Association football defenders